Rajvinder Sandhu (born 10 July 1991) is a New Zealand cricketer. He made his List A debut for Auckland on 15 January 2017 in the 2016–17 Ford Trophy. He made his first-class debut for Auckland on 25 February 2017 in the 2016–17 Plunket Shield season.

References

External links
 

1991 births
Living people
New Zealand cricketers
Auckland cricketers
Cricketers from Auckland